Club FM may refer to:

 Club FM, Tirana, a radio station in Tirana, Albania
 Club FM 94.3, a radio station in Kerala, India
 ClubFM, a Belgian radio station, successor to the Flemish version of Radio Contact